Blaine Stanley (born 28 September 1978) is an Australian former professional rugby league footballer who played for Cronulla and South Sydney in the National Rugby League (NRL).

Biography
Stanley, an Indigenous Australian from Wellington, New South Wales, played as a halfback and occasionally at five-eighth.

From 1998 to 2000 he made 28 first-grade appearances for Cronulla in the NRL. In a game against North Queensland in 2000 he scored a career high 22 points, with two tries and seven goals.

In the 2002 NRL season he joined South Sydney, which were returning to the league following a two-year expulsion. He featured in seven first-grade games.

Released by South Sydney after one season, Stanley returned home to play for Wellington.

References

External links
Blaine Stanley at Rugby League project

1978 births
Living people
Australian rugby league players
Indigenous Australian rugby league players
Cronulla-Sutherland Sharks players
South Sydney Rabbitohs players
Rugby league halfbacks
Rugby league five-eighths
Rugby league players from New South Wales